Rhampholeon temporalis, the Usambara stumptail chameleon or East Usambara pygmy chameleon, is a species of chameleon found in Tanzania.

References

Rhampholeon
Reptiles described in 1892
Taxa named by Paul Matschie
Reptiles of Tanzania